Below is a list of Yours Fatefully episodes which was broadcast on MediaCorp Channel 8.

Episodic synopsis

Lists of Singaporean television series episodes
Lists of comedy television series episodes
Lists of soap opera episodes